The M60 is a short metropolitan route in Johannesburg, South Africa. It connects Sandton with the Linbro Business Park adjacent to Modderfontein.

Route 
The M60 begins at the northern entrance to Linbro Park (west of Modderfontein; south of Frankenwald), heading westwards. It crosses the N3 Highway (Johannesburg Eastern Bypass) into Sandton and separates the Kelvin suburb in the north from Marlboro Gardens in the south. It crosses the M1 Freeway (De Villiers Graaff Motorway) and ends immediately thereafter at a t-junction with the M85 road in the suburb of Kramerville.

References 

Streets and roads of Johannesburg
Metropolitan routes in Johannesburg